Koldo Serra (born 15 April 1975) is a Spanish film director and screenwriter, born in Bilbao.

Filmography

Director
 Amor de madre (1999)
 El Tren de la bruja (2003)
 The Backwoods (2006)
 Gominolas (2007) TV series (1 episode)
 El Comisario (2008) TV series (1 episode)
 Es bello vivir (2008) TV
 Muchachada nui (2009) TV series (1 episode)
 70 Binladens (2019)
 Money Heist (2019) TV series (2 episodes)

Screenwriter
 Amor de madre (1999)
 El Tren de la bruja (2003)
 The Backwoods (2006)
 ASD. Alma sin dueño (2008)
 Muchachada nui (2009) TV series (1 episode)
 Guernica'' (2016)

References

External links 
 
 Imdb link

Film directors from the Basque Country (autonomous community)
Spanish screenwriters
Spanish male writers
Male screenwriters
1975 births
People from Bilbao
Living people